Silene disticha is a species of flowering plant in the family Caryophyllaceae. The species is hermaphroditic and is native to Algeria, Morocco, Portugal, Spain, and Tunisia.

References 

disticha